Andreas Vikhos (born 1877, date of death unknown) was a Greek sports shooter. He competed at the 1920 Summer Olympics and the 1924 Summer Olympics.

References

External links
 

1877 births
Year of death missing
Greek male sport shooters
Olympic shooters of Greece
Shooters at the 1920 Summer Olympics
Shooters at the 1924 Summer Olympics
Place of birth missing
20th-century Greek people